Daniel Jean (born 21 January 1997) is a French judoka.

He is the bronze medallist of the 2018 Judo Grand Prix Tbilisi in the -66 kg category.

References

External links
 

1997 births
Living people
French male judoka
21st-century French people